The Coleselva River is a river in Svalbard, Norway. It runs through the Colesdalen Valley. The river empties into the fjord.

References

Rivers of Spitsbergen